The demographics of the European Union show a highly populated, culturally diverse union of 27 member states.
As of 1 January 2022, the population of the EU is just below 447 million people.

Population by country 
The most populous member state is Germany, with an estimated 82.8 million people, and the least populous member state is Malta with 0.52 million. 
Birth rates in the EU are rather low with the average woman having 1.6 children.  The highest birth-rates are found in Ireland with 16.876 births per thousand people per year and France with 13.013 births per thousand people per year. Spain has the lowest birth rate in Europe with 8.221 births per thousand people per year.

Most populous areas

The European Union has a significant number of global cities. It contained 13 of the 60 cities which composed the 2008 Global Cities Index, as well as 16 of the 41 "alpha" global cities classified by Globalization and World Cities (GaWC) Research Network (including Paris, Milan, Amsterdam and Brussels among others). The following is a list of the ten most populous cities, urban areas and urban zones in the European Union, with their population:

Population shifts

Migration 
The movement of people within the Union i.e. internal migration, remains limited; it has traditionally followed two patterns:

Younger workers from less economically developed regions and countries of the EU tend to move to more prosperous regions in their country or to EU countries with good economic prospects (i.e. Ireland, Germany, Netherlands, France, Italy, Portugal, Spain, Poland)
Retirees from wealthier places with colder weather (i.e. the Low Countries and Germany, among other places) tend to move to the sun belt in southern Europe – i.e. Spain, Portugal, Southern France, Italian peninsula and Greece.

Immigration and emigration

At present, more people immigrate into the European Union than emigrate from it.  Immigration is a controversial issue in many member states, including Belgium, Sweden, Germany, Italy, the Netherlands, Spain, and France. It was also a cited as a major factor in the Brexit referendum of 2016.

In 2010, 47.3 million people living in the EU, or 9.4% of the total population, had been born outside their resident country.  Of these, 31.4 million (6.3%) had been born outside the EU; 16.0 million (3.2%) had been born in another member state.  The largest absolute numbers of people born outside the EU were in Germany (6.4 million), France (5.1 million), Spain (4.1 million), Italy (3.2 million), and the Netherlands (1.4 million).

In 2017, approximately 825,000 persons acquired citizenship of a member state of the European Union, down from 995,000 in 2016. The largest groups were nationals of Morocco, Albania, India, Turkey and Pakistan.

Spain in particular receives most of the immigrants coming illegally to Europe from Africa, probably due to its large coastal area and its proximity to and land borders with Morocco at Ceuta and Melilla; African immigrants try to enter the country by boat from Morocco or Senegal or by jumping the border fences.  For example, during just the first weekend of September 2006, more than 1,300 illegal immigrants arrived on beaches in the Canary Islands and estimates are that between 50,000 and 70,000 people enter the European Union illegally through Spanish borders or beaches. Border fences have been built at both the Ceuta and Melilla borders in an attempt to stop illegal entrance to the country. Illegal immigration is an issue in Spanish politics, and also a big human rights problem, since many people die during the journey. Spain has been Europe's largest absorber of migrants for the past six years, with its immigrant population increasing fourfold as 2.8 million people have arrived, mostly from Latin America. Spectacular growth in Spain's immigrant population came as the country's economy created more than half of all the new jobs in the European Union between 2001 and 2006.

The net migration rate for the EU in 2008 was 3.1 per 1,000 inhabitants; this figure is for migration into and out of the European Union, and therefore excludes any internal movements between member states.  Annual net migration has varied from 1.5 to 2.0 million people since 2003.

Vital statistics

27 countries (from 2020)

Since 2020, EU data is aggregated for the 27 remaining states. UK is no longer a member due to Brexit.

28 countries (2013–2020)

Before Brexit, EU data was aggregated for 28 countries member of the EU from 2013 until 2020, including the UK.

Religion

The EU has significant religious diversity, mirroring its diverse history and culture. The largest religious group professes 
Christianity and accounts for 64% of the EU population in 2019, down from 72% in 2012. Largest Christian groups are Roman Catholicism, Protestantism and Eastern Orthodoxy. Several EU nations do not have a Christian majority and for example in Estonia and the Czech Republic the majority have no religious affiliation.

European countries have experienced a decline in church attendance as well as a decline in the number of people professing a religious belief. The 2010 Eurobarometer Poll found that, on average, 51% of the citizens of EU Member States state that they believe there is a God, 26% believe there is some sort of spirit or life force and 20% don't believe there is any sort of spirit, God or life force. 3% declined to answer. These figures show a 2% change from theism to atheism since 2005.

European indigenous (or native) religions are still alive in small and diverse minorities, especially in Scandinavia, Baltic states, Italy and Greece.

The recent influx of immigrants to the affluent EU nations has brought in various religions of their native homelands, including Islam, Hinduism, Buddhism, Sikhism and the Baháʼí Faith. Judaism has had a long history in Europe and has coexisted with the other religions for centuries, despite periods of persecution or genocide by European rulers. Islam too has had a long history in Europe, with Spain and Portugal at one time having a Muslim majority. Large Muslim populations also exist in the Balkans and parts of Eastern Europe, due to a legacy of centuries of Ottoman rule.

Language

The first official language of each of the 27 Member Countries has the status of an official language of the European Union. In total there are 24, with Irish, Bulgarian and Romanian gaining official language status on 1 January 2007, when the last two countries joined the European Union, and Croatian becoming official in 2013.

Before Brexit, English was the most spoken language in the EU, being spoken by around 51% of its population. This high proportion is because 38% of EU citizens speak it as a language other than their mother tongue (i.e. second or foreign language). German is the most spoken first language, spoken by more than 20% of the population following Brexit.

Demographic future

The EU faces challenges in its demographic future. Most concerns center around several related issues: an ageing population, growing life expectancy and immigrant flow.

After hitting a historical low of 1.47 children born per female, the total fertility rate of the EU started to increase again, to reach a level of 1.60 in 2008. The positive trend was observed in all member states with the exception of Luxembourg, Malta and Portugal. The largest increases over this period were observed in Bulgaria (from 1.23 children per woman in 2003 to 1.57 in 2009), Slovenia (from 1.20 to 1.53), the Czech Republic (from 1.18 to 1.49) and Lithuania (from 1.26 to 1.55). In 2009, the Member States with the highest fertility rates were Ireland (2.06), France (2.00), Sweden (1.94), and the United Kingdom (1.90), all approaching the replacement level of 2.1 children born per female. The lowest rates were observed in Latvia (1.31), Hungary and Portugal (both 1.32) and Germany (1.36). The increasing fertility rate has also been accompanied by an upward trend in the natural increase of the population which is due to the moderate increase of the crude birth rate that reached 10.9 births per 1000 inhabitants in 2008, an increase of 0.3 compared with 2007. The increase was observed in all member countries except Germany. The EU crude death rate remained stable at 9.7 per 1000 inhabitants. The relatively low fertility rate means retirement age workers are not entirely replaced by younger workers joining the workforce. The EU faces a potential future dominated by an ever-increasing population of retired citizens, without enough younger workers to fund (via taxes) retirement programs or other state welfare agendas.

A low fertility rate, without supplement from immigration, also suggests a declining overall EU population, which further suggests economic contraction or even a possible economic crisis. Some media have noted the 'baby crisis' in the EU, some governments have noted the problem, and the UN and other multinational authorities have warned of a possible crisis. At this point however such a decrease in the population of the EU is not observed as the overall natural growth remains positive and the EU continues to attract large numbers of immigrants. In 2010, a breakdown of the population by citizenship showed that there were 20.1 million foreign citizens living in the EU representing 4% of the population.

Over the last 50 years, life expectancy at birth in the EU27 has increased by around 10 years for both women and men, to reach 82.4 years for women and 76.4 years for men in 2008. The life expectancy at birth rose in all Member States, with the largest increases for both women and men recorded in Estonia and Slovenia.

Population projections
In 2017, Eurostat released yearly projections up to 2080.

The table figures below are in thousands.

Ethnic composition

There is no precise or universally accepted definition of the terms "ethnic group" or "nationality". In the context of European ethnography in particular, the terms ethnic group, people (without nation state), nationality, national minority, ethnic minority, linguistic community, linguistic group and linguistic minority are used as mostly synonymous, although preference may vary in usage with respect to the situation specific to the individual countries of Europe.

Defining ethnic composition requires defining ethnic minority groups.
European Commission, funded the European Social Survey which considered three different way to define ethnic minority groups:
 citizenship is the traditional criteria in the EU, it might be meaningful in western Europe and meaningless in eastern Europe and the USA
 country of birth in combination with country of birth of the parents gives three classes: native background, western foreign background, and non-western background with two levels: first generation (foreign born) and second generation (born in the country)
 membership to one member country minority group.

However main legal EU statistics published by Eurostat focus on citizenship and country of birth.

Ethnicity based on nationality
The largest groups that account for about 400 million people in the European Union are:
 
  Germany (c. 80 million of whom 65,38 million ethno-cultural Germans)
  France (c. 65 million)
  Italy (c. 60 million)
  Spain (c. 45 million)
  Poland (c. 42 million)
  Romania (c. 20 million) (not counting Moldovans and Aromanians)
  Netherlands (c. 17.2 million)
  Greece (c. 12 million)
  Belgium (c. 11.4 million)
  Portugal (c. 10.8 million) 
  Czech Republic (c. 10.5 million)
 
The rest are various smaller ethnic groups include Swedes (c. 10.2  million), Hungary (c. 9.8 million), Austrians (c. 8.8 million), Bulgaria (c. 8 million) Flemish, Croats, Slovaks, Silesians, Danes, Finns, Irish, Walloons, Lithuanians, Slovenes, Latvians, Estonians, Russians, Maltese, Moravians, Frisians and Basques.

More than 5 million ethnic groups 
  Sweden (c. 10.2 million)
  Hungary (c. 9.8 million)
  Austria (c. 8.8 million)
 About 6.3 million Irish people live in (the Republic of) Ireland and Northern Ireland.
 Some 6 million Romani people live in various parts of the EU.
  Denmark (c. 5.8 million)
  Finland (c. 5.5 million).
  Slovakia (c. 5.4 million).

On current trends European populations will become more ethnically diverse, with the possibility that today's majority ethnic groups will no longer comprise a numerical majority in some countries.

In 2011, almost a quarter of new EU citizens were Moroccans, Turks, Ecuadorian or Indians. The new citizens in the old EU27 in 2011 came mainly from Africa (26% of the total number of citizenships acquired), Asia (23%), non-EU27 Europe (19%), North and South America (17%) or another EU27 Member State (11%). In 2011, the largest groups that acquired citizenship of an EU27 Member State were citizens of Morocco (64 300 persons, of which 55% acquired citizenship of France or Spain), Turkey (48 900, 58% acquired German citizenship), Ecuador (33 700, 95% acquired Spanish citizenship) and India (31 700, 83% acquired British citizenship).

In 2012, 34.3 million foreign citizens lived in the old 27 European Union member states, accounting for 6.8% of the European Union population, of whom 20.5 million were third country nationals (i.e. nationals of non-EU countries). The number of foreign-born (which includes those who have naturalised or are dual nationals) was 48.9 million or 9.7 per cent of the total population.

A total of 8.0 million citizens from European countries outside of the old EU-27 were residing in the EU at the beginning of 2012; among these more than half were citizens of Turkey, Albania or Ukraine. The next biggest group was from Africa (24.5%), followed by Asia (22.0%), the Americas (14.2%) and Oceania (0.8%). Romanians (living in another EU Member State) and Turkish citizens made up the biggest groups of non-nationals living in the EU-27 in 2012. There were 4.4 million Romanian citizens living outside of Romania within the EU-27 and 2.3 million Turkish citizens living in the EU-27; each of these two groups of people accounted for 7.0% of all foreigners living in the EU-27 in 2012. The third largest group was Moroccans (1.9 million people, or 5.6% of all foreigners).

Approximately 20 million non-Europeans live in the EU, 4% of the overall population prior to Brexit.

Miscellaneous statistics

Age structure: (2006 est.)
 0–14 years: 16.03% (male 37,608,010/female 35,632,351)
 15–64 years: 67.17% (male 154,439,536/female 152,479,619)
 65 years and over: 16.81% (male 31,515,921/female 45,277,821)

Birth rate: 10.9 births/1,000 population (2008)

Death rate: 9.7 deaths/1,000 population (2008)

Net migration rate: 3.1 migrant(s)/1,000 population (2008)

Marriage rate: 4.9 marriages/1,000 population (2007)

Divorce rate: 2.0 divorces/1,000 population (2005)

Sex ratio: (2006 est.)
 at birth: 1.06 male(s)/female
 under 15 years: 1.06 male(s)/female
 15–64 years: 1.01 male(s)/female
 65 years and older: 0.69 male(s)/female
 total population: 0.96 male(s)/female

Infant mortality rate: (2005)
 total: 4.5 deaths/1,000 live births
 male: N/A
 female: N/A

Life expectancy: (2005)
 total population: 78.9 years
 male: 75.8 years
 female: 81.9 years

Total fertility rate: 1.59 children born/woman 2009

Live Births outside marriage: 40% of total live births in 2012

See also
Demography of Europe
List of European Union member states by population
Population Europe
Latin Americans in Europe

The demographics of the member states of the European Union:

Austria
Belgium
Bulgaria
Croatia
Cyprus
Czech Republic
Denmark
Estonia
Finland
France
Germany
Greece
Hungary
Ireland
Italy
Latvia
Lithuania
Luxembourg
Malta
The Netherlands
Poland
Portugal
Romania
Slovakia
Slovenia
Spain
Sweden

References

External links
10 Million Europeans – Will Europe's population collapse?

 
European Union
European Union-related lists